The Ernesto Rojas Commandos, was a small guerrilla group in Colombia.  It was formed through a split in the EPL in 1991. It demobilized through a peace treaty with the government in 1992. At the time of demobilization CER had 25 fighters.

References

External links
Peace treaty

Colombian guerrilla movements
Left-wing militant groups